Erythrolamprus almadensis, the Almaden ground snake, is a species of snake in the family Colubridae. The species is found in  Brazil, Paraguay, Argentina, Uruguay, Bolivia, and Peru.

References

Erythrolamprus
Reptiles of Brazil
Reptiles of Peru
Reptiles described in 1824
Taxa named by Johann Georg Wagler